Martens is a surname. Notable people with the surname include:

 Adolf Martens (1850–1914), a German metallurgist
 Conrad Martens (1801–1878), an English-born artist active in Australia
 Eduard von Martens (1831–1904), a German zoologist
 Friedrich Martens (1845–1909), a Russian diplomat
 Friderich Martens (1635–1699), a German physician and naturalist 
 George Martens (1874–1949), an Australian politician
 Georg Friedrich von Martens (1756–1821), a German jurist and diplomat
 Jürgen Martens (born 1959), German politician
 Ludo Martens (born 1946), a Belgian historian and chairman of the Workers' Party of Belgium
 Ludwig Martens (1875-1948), Soviet diplomat and engineer
 Maarten Martens  (born 1984), a Belgian football player
 Martin Martens (M.Martens, 1797-1863), a botanist
 Maria Martens (born 1955), a Dutch politician
 Maurice Martens (born 1947), a Belgian football player
 René Martens (born 1955), a Belgian cyclist
 Rudy Martens (born ca. 1958), a Belgian organizational theorist
 Sandy Martens (born 1972), a Belgian football player
 Theodor Martens (1822–1884), a German artist
 Wilfried Martens, (1936–2013), a Flemish Belgian politician

Dutch-language surnames
Patronymic surnames
Surnames from given names
Russian Mennonite surnames